The 2B11 is a 120 mm mortar developed by the Soviet Union in 1981 and subsequently fielded in the Soviet Army. The basic design for the 2B11 was taken from the classic Model 1943 120 mm mortar, and incorporated changes to make the mortar less heavy. Is a part of the 2S12 Sani.

The 2B11 has proliferated to other countries primarily as result of the collapse of the Soviet Union.

Operators

Current operators 
 
  – 14 as part of 2S12 as of 2021
 
  – 66 as of 2021
  – 14 as part of 2S12 as of 2021.
 
  – 45 as of 2021
  – 6 as part of 2S12 as of 2021.
 
  – 20 as of 2021
  – 14 or 15 as of 2021 
  – 1730+ as of 2021
Ground Forces – 1700 as part of 2S12 of which 1000 are in store
Border Guard – Unknown number of 2S12
National Guard – 30 as part of 2S12
 – Unknown number
  – 214 as of 2021
Ground Forces – 190 as part of 2S12
Air Assault Forces – 24 as part of 2S12
  – 24 of which 19 as part of 2S12 as of 2021.
  – 48 as part of 2S12 as of 2021.

Former operators 
 : Libya Dawn

Variants 
 2B11A – A modernized version with an improved base plate.
Some countries have developed self-propelled versions of the 2B11:
 SMM 74 B1.10 "Tundzha-Sani" – Bulgarian version on MT-LB.
 SM120 – Belarusian version on MT-LBu.
 Aybat – Kazakh version on MT-LB.

See also 
 Cardom 120 mm recoil mortar system
 Soltam K6 120 mm mortar
 Soltam M-65 120 mm mortar
 120 KRH 92 120 mm mortar
 120mm M2 RAIADO 120 mm mortar
 2S12 Sani 120 mm mortar
 Mortier 120 mm Rayé Tracté Modèle F1 120 mm mortar

Notes

External links 
 Jane's Infantry Weapons – 2B11 Sani

Artillery of Russia
Mortars of the Soviet Union
Infantry mortars
Motovilikha Plants products
120mm mortars
Military equipment introduced in the 1980s